Daniel A. Dailey (born January 11, 1969) is a United States Army soldier who served as the 15th Sergeant Major of the Army from January 30, 2015, to August 9, 2019. Prior to his tenure as the Sergeant Major of the Army, he served as the Command Sergeant Major for the United States Army Training and Doctrine Command.

Early life and education
A native of Palmerton, Pennsylvania, Dailey entered the United States Army as an 11B (Infantryman) in 1989. He enlisted at the age of 17 prior to graduating high school. He attended Basic Training and Advanced Individual Training at Fort Benning, Georgia. His civilian education includes a Bachelor of Science degree in history from Excelsior University.

Military career

Dailey's military education includes Basic Noncommissioned Officer's Course, the Bradley Master Gunner Course, the Advanced Noncommissioned Officer's Course, First Sergeants Course, the Force Management Course, the Keystone Course, the Sergeants Major Academy, and the Command Sergeants Major course. He has served in the 1st, 2nd, 3rd and 4th Infantry Divisions.

Dailey is decorated with the Bronze Star Medal with Valor for his leadership during the Siege of Sadr City. Later, he was selected as the 4th Infantry Division command sergeant major in 2009. Prior to his selection as the Sergeant Major of the Army, he served as the command sergeant major of the United States Army Training and Doctrine Command.

As Sergeant Major of the Army, Dailey served as the Chief of Staff of the United States Army's personal adviser on all enlisted-related matters, particularly in areas affecting soldier training and quality of life. In August 2019, Dailey stepped down as Sergeant Major of the Army and was succeeded in his post by Command Sergeant Major Michael A. Grinston. Dailey's official retirement date was January 1, 2020.

Personal life
Dailey is a member of the Order of Saint Maurice (Centurion) and a member of the Distinguished Sergeant Audie Murphy Club.

Awards and decorations

References

External links
Official Site as Sergeant Major of the Army
Official U.S. Army Biography

1969 births
Living people
People from Carbon County, Pennsylvania
Military personnel from Pennsylvania
Recipients of the Distinguished Service Medal (US Army)
Recipients of the Legion of Merit
Excelsior College alumni
Sergeants Major of the Army